Hamdan ben Othman Khodja (1773–1842) was an Algerian dignitary and scholar. He wrote the book "Le Miroir" in which he denounced the encroachments by French soldiers in Algiers, thus becoming the first essayist on this subject.

Biography
Khodja was born in Algiers, Algeria, in 1773 to a family of Turkish origin belonging to the high administration of the regency. His father was a Turkish scholar, an alim and also the defterdar of the deylik. His mother was a local woman from Algiers. He was thus a "kouloughli". Hamdan received an excellent education and was well travelled. He was thought religious sciences by his father, and succeeded greatly academically. As a reward, in 1784, when his uncle had the responsibility of taking the dey’s gift to Constantinople, he was also present. After his father’s death, his uncle brought him into his business and sent him in his stead to cities such as Tunis, Livorno, Marseilles, London and Gibraltar, thereby giving him the opportunity to learn Turkish, French and English.  Khodja became known as one of the most important merchants and richest men in Algiers, where he was in very great demand from colleagues desiring to participate in his commercial operations which extended to the Ottoman Empire as well as to Europe.

When he became a victim of the French conquest of 1830, he sent a petition to King Louis Philippe to complain about the atrocities committed against him by the French Army. Furthermore, Khodja wrote the book "Le Miroir" in which he denounced the encroachments by French soldiers in Algiers, thus becoming the first essayist on this subject; it was translated into French and printed in Paris in 1833.

References

Bibliography 
 
.
.
.
 .

Muftis of Algiers
Algerian essayists
Algerian people of Turkish descent
Businesspeople from Algiers
1773 births
1842 deaths